The 2004-05 season in Danish football, starting July 2004 and ending June 2005:

Events
 20 July 2004: FC København won the Super Cup at Parken Stadium after a 2-1 victory against AaB.
 24 July 2004: The Superliga kicks off.
 31 July 2004: The 1st Division kicks off.
 31 July 2004: The 2nd Division kicks off.
 4 August 2004: FC København are beaten by Slovenian NK Gorica 2-6 agg. in the second qualifying round in the UEFA Champions League.
 26 August 2004: AaB beats Lithuanian FK Žalgiris Vilnius 3-1 agg. and Brøndby IF are beaten by Latvian FK Ventspils 1-1 (ag) in All this in the UEFA Cup's second qualifying round.
 30 September 2004: AaB are beaten by French AJ Auxerre in the UEFA Cup first round.
 11 November 2004: Royal League kicks off.
 December 2004: Yearly awards by the players association:
2004 Danish Superliga profile: Mohamed Zidan, FC Midtjylland
2004 Danish 1st Division profile: Jacob Olesen, SønderjyskE
2004 Danish 2nd Division profile: Christian Holst, Lyngby BK
2004 team of the year: Thomas Sørensen (Aston Villa), Daniel Agger (BIF), Leon Andreasen (AGF), Per Krøldrup (Udinese), Niclas Jensen (Dortmund), Thomas Kahlenberg (BIF), Thomas Gravesen (Everton), Martin Retov (BIF), Steffen Højer (OB), Jon Dahl Tomasson (AC Milan), Mohamed Zidan (FCM).
2004 talent of the year: Daniel Agger, Brøndby IF
 28 December 2004: Yearly awards by Sports Confederation of Denmark:
2004 Danish footballer of the year: Jon Dahl Tomasson, AC Milan
2004 best goal in the Superliga: Martin Ericsson, AaB against Herfølge BK on 24 October
 Late December 2004 2004 Goalie of the year: Jimmy Nielsen, AaB
 24 February 2005: FC København, Brøndby IF, Esbjerg fB and OB played their last game in the Royal League group stage against IFK Göteborg (1-0), Tromsø IL (4-2), Vålerenga I.F. (1-1) and Malmö FF (1-2). FC København were the only Danish team going to the second round.
 28 April 2005: FC København played their last game in the Royal League 2nd group stage against Malmö FF 2-1. FCK will go to the final, only if Malmö FF and Rosenborg ended with a draw or an MFF win.
 5 May 2005: Brøndby IF won the final in the Danish Cup after extra time 3-2 against FC Midtjylland at Parken, Copenhagen.
 12 May 2005: FC København went to the final in Royal League, after a 4-2 Malmö FF win against Rosenborg.
 16 May 2005: Brøndby IF won a record high 5-0 win against arch-rivals FC København
 26 May 2005: FC København won the final in Royal League against IFK Göteborg after a very exciting penalty shootout the match ended 12-11.
 11 June 2005: Brøndby IF guaranteed the championship.
 12 June 2005: Kolding FC guaranteed the 2nd Division championship.
 18 June 2005: Last round in the 1st Division were played. SønderjyskE ended as champions.
 18 June 2005: Last round in the 2nd Division were played.
 19 June 2005: Last round in the Superliga were played.

National team results

* Denmark scores first

Key
 H = Home match
 A = Away match
 N = Neutral site match
 F = Friendly
 WCQ2 = FIFA World Cup 2006 Qualifying, European Zone Group 2

Honours

See also
 2004–05 Danish Superliga season
 2004–05 Danish 1st Division season
 2004–05 Danish Cup season

 
Danish football
Seasons in Danish football